Sisyroctenis is a genus of moths in the family Brachodidae. It contains the single species Sisyroctenis hemicamina, which is found in Peru.

References

Brachodidae